Stony Creek is a stream in Scott and Wise counties, Virginia, in the United States. It is a tributary of the Clinch River.

The name is descriptive of the creek bed.

See also
List of rivers of Virginia

References

Rivers of Scott County, Virginia
Rivers of Wise County, Virginia
Rivers of Virginia